The Journal of Conflict Resolution is a bimonthly peer-reviewed academic journal covering research on international conflict and conflict resolution. It was established in 1957 and is published by SAGE Publications. The editor-in-chief is Paul Huth (University of Maryland, College Park).

History 
The journal was established in 1957. In 1959, the journal was run by the Center for Research on Conflict Resolution at the University of Michigan in Ann Arbor. When the Center closed in 1971 due to lack of funding, the journal was run by a team at Yale University. Since 2009, the journal has been run by a team at the University of Maryland. Bruce Russett was a long-time editor-in-chief of the journal prior to Paul Huth's appointment as editor-in-chief in 2009.

Abstracting and indexing 
The journal is abstracted and indexed in Scopus, RePEc, and the Social Sciences Citation Index. According to the Journal Citation Reports, the journal has a 2017 impact factor of 3.491, ranking it 8th out of 69 journals in the category "Political Science" and 5th out of 85 journals in the category "International Relations".

References

External links 
 

SAGE Publishing academic journals
English-language journals
International relations journals
Bimonthly journals
Publications established in 1957
Peace and conflict studies